Ronnie "Machine Gun" Green (born April 1, 1959) is a retired British professional kickboxer who is a former four-time world champion.

Biography

Green became a world champion in kickboxing and was the first British person to do so. Green also won titles in four different weight divisions. Green was raised in Manchester and first began training in martial arts in 1974, taking up judo and karate. Green began his training with Thohsaphon "Master Toddy" Sitiwatjana at his Deansgate gym in Manchester, England, in 1977. After wins in the Netherlands and France, Green became the first Brit to win a kickboxing match in Thailand by defeating Lamnak Pitiporn at Rajadamnern Stadium in March 1983. Green won the European Muay Thai title in by defeating Yasunori Suda in July 1983 and the World WKA Super Featherweight title in 1984 by defeating Joao Vieira in Amsterdam. Green fought Sombat Sor Thanikul to a draw in 1990 in London, an event that was one of the first kickboxing championships broadcast from the UK to Thailand. In a rematch ten months later, he defeated Thanikul. He formally retired from fighting in 2002.  He won the World Kickboxing Association (WKA) light middleweight and super welterweight full contact titles.

Fight record (incomplete)

|-  style="background:#cfc;"
| 1995- || Win||align=left| Lance Lewis || Clash for Cash || Manchester, England || Decision  ||  ||

|-  style="background:#fbb;"
| 1993-12-04 || Loss ||align=left| Pete Cunningham || W.K.A. Event at Mirage Hotel || Las Vegas, Nevada, USA || Decision (unanimous) || 12 || 2:00  
|-
! style=background:white colspan=9 |

|-  bgcolor="#CCFFCC"
| ? || Win ||align=left| Paul Lenihan || WKA Thai Boxing || United Kingdom || Decision || 5 ||3:00

|-  bgcolor="#CCFFCC"
| ? || Win ||align=left| Darrell Eckles || Thai Boxing Superfights || Oldham, England || ||  ||

|-  style="background:#fbb;"
| 1992-|| Loss||align=left| Samaisuk Chuwattana ||  || London, England || KO || 1 || 
|-
! style=background:white colspan=9 |

|-  style="background:#cfc;"
| 1992-04-|| Win||align=left| Samaisuk Chuwattana ||  || London, England || Decision (Majority) || 5 || 3:00
|-
! style=background:white colspan=9 |

|-  style="background:#cfc;"
| 1990-11-18|| Win||align=left| Sombat Sor.Thanikul ||  || London, England || Decision || 5 || 3:00
|-
! style=background:white colspan=9 |

|-  style="background:#c5d2ea;"
| 1990-01-28|| Draw||align=left| Sombat Sor.Thanikul || IMF at Pickett's Lock || London, England || Decision || 5 || 3:00

|-  bgcolor="#cfc"
| 1989-11-19 || Win ||align=left| Joao Vieira ||  || Amsterdam, Netherlands || Decision || 12||2:00 
|-
! style=background:white colspan=9 |

|-  style="background:#fbb;"
| 1989-03-18|| Loss ||align=left| Sagat Petchyindee || AJKF || Tokyo, Japan || Decision (Unanimous)|| 5 || 3:00

|-  bgcolor="#CCFFCC"
| 1988- || Win ||align=left|  ||  || Hong Kong ||  ||  ||

|-  bgcolor="#CCFFCC"
| 1988-03-12 || Win ||align=left| Kyoji Saito || A.J.K.F "Kakutougi Daisensou" || Tokyo, Japan || KO (Punches) || 11 || 1:46
|-
! style=background:white colspan=9 |

|-  bgcolor="#CCFFCC"
| 1987-11-15 || Win ||align=left| Kyoji Saito || A.J.K.F "Super Fight 3" || Tokyo, Japan || Decision || 5 || 3:00

|-  bgcolor="#CCFFCC"
| 1987-09- || Win ||align=left| Brian Cullen ||  || Manchester, England || Decision || 12 || 2:00
|-
! style=background:white colspan=9 |

|-  bgcolor="#CCFFCC"
| 1987-07-15 || Win ||align=left| Eiji Kai || A.J.K.F  || Tokyo, Japan || KO (High kick + punches)|| 1 || 2:53

|-  bgcolor="#fbb"
| 1986-|| Loss ||align=left| Pat Romero || Master Toddy Promotion || Manchester, England || Decision || 12||2:00 
|-
! style=background:white colspan=9 |

|-  bgcolor="#cfc"
| ? || Win ||align=left| Mohamed Jami ||  || England || Decision || 5 ||3:00

|-  bgcolor="#cfc"
| 1985-05-12 || Win ||align=left| Pud Pad Nee || Kickfighters IV || Amsterdam, Netherlands || KO (Left hook) || 1 ||

|-  bgcolor="#cfc"
| 1984-10-26 || Win ||align=left| Jo Prestia ||  || Manchester, England || Decision || 5 ||3:00

|-  bgcolor="#cfc"
| 1984-09- || Win ||align=left| Gallen ||  || Dublin, Ireland || ||  ||

|-  bgcolor="#cfc"
| 1984-04-21 || Win ||align=left| Joao Vieira || Night of the Stars || Amsterdam, Netherlands || KO || 2|| 
|-
! style=background:white colspan=9 |

|-  bgcolor="#c5d2ea"
| 1984-01-12 || Draw ||align=left| Joao Vieira ||  || Amsterdam, Netherlands || Decision  || 5 || 3:00

|-  bgcolor="#c5d2ea"
| 1983-09-23 || Draw||align=left| Philippe Cantamessi ||  || Amsterdam, Netherlands || Decision  || 5 || 3:00
|-
! style=background:white colspan=9 |

|-  bgcolor="#CCFFCC"
| 1983-07-15 || Win ||align=left| Yasunori Suda||  || Hong Kong || TKO (Elbow) ||3  ||

|-  bgcolor="#CCFFCC"
| 1983-06-18 || Win ||align=left| Jin ||  || Hong Kong || KO ||1  ||

|-  bgcolor="#fbb"
| 1983-05-15 || Loss ||align=left| ||  || Bangkok, Thailand || Decision ||5  ||3:00

|-  bgcolor="#c5d2ea"
| 1983-04-21 || Draw||align=left| ||  || Manchester, England || Decision ||5  || 3:00

|-  bgcolor="#CCFFCC"
| 1983-04-08 || Win ||align=left| ||  || Hong Kong || Decision ||5  || 3:00

|-  style="background:#cfc;"
| 1983-03-31|| Win ||align=left| Lamnak Pitiporn || Rajadamnern Stadium || Bangkok, Thailand || KO || 2 ||

|-  bgcolor="#cfc"
| 1982-06-11 || Win ||align=left| Wattana Soudareth ||  || France || KO (Left hook) || 5 ||

|-  bgcolor="#cfc"
| 1982-04-04 || Win ||align=left| Gilbert Ballantine ||  || Amsterdam, Netherlands || Decision || 5 || 3:00

|-  bgcolor="#fbb"
| ? || Loss||align=left| Lucien Carbin ||   ||  || KO|| 2 ||

|-  bgcolor="#fbb"
| ? || Loss||align=left| René Desjardins ||  || France || KO || 4 ||

|-  bgcolor="#cfc"
| 1979- || Win ||align=left| Lonkeada Muangsurin ||  || Amsterdam, Netherlands || KO || 5 || 
|-
| colspan=9 | Legend:

References

1959 births
Living people
Sportspeople from Manchester
English Muay Thai practitioners
English male kickboxers
Welterweight kickboxers
Middleweight kickboxers
Black British sportspeople